The Battle of Káty was fought between the Hungarian IV corps led by General Mór Perczel and the Austrian and Croatian soldiers of the Southern Army led by the Ban of Croatia Lieutenant Field Marshal Josip Jelačić, as part of the fight for Southern Hungary, consisting of the Bácska, Bánság and Slavonia provinces, at 7 June 1849, as part of the Summer Campaign of the 1848-1849 Hungarian Revolution of 1848 and Freedom War. Fought between two equal sized armies, the Hungarians suffered a nearly catastrophic defeat, failing to occupy the Southern regions, losing the initiative gained in the Spring Campaign. However, after the battle, Jelačić did not profit from his victory, by trying to crush the weakened Hungarians, but retreated, enabling them to reorganize.

Background 
As the results of the string of victories of the Hungarian army led by General Artúr Görgei in the Spring Campaign, the Austrian army, which the end of Mart controlled Western and Central Hungary, with the Tisza river as the front line, was forced to retreat to the Western frontier of Hungary in order to defend Vienna from an eventual Hungarian attack. While the bulk of the Austrian troops retreated towards West, the Ban of Croatia Lieutenant Field Marshal Josip Jelačić was ordered by the new commander of the Austrian forces from Hungary, Field Marshall Ludwig von Welden, to march with the I corps, consisting of 12 500 soldiers and 54 cannons to Southern Hungary in order to support the Serbian insurgents, who were at the brink of being totally crushed by the Hungarian armies operating in Southern Hungary, led by General Mór Perczel and General Józef Bem.  Jelačić started his march, following the stream of the Danube from Pest towards Southern Hungary on 24 April. His supply ships carrying the heavy weapons arrived to Eszék in the next day. On 10 May Jelačić arrived with the I corps to Eszék, and he started to form the so called Southern Army from the Austrian, Croatian and Serbian units found in Southern Hungary. These troops consisted of two separate parts. One of these, called the mobile or field troops consisted of three infantry divisions, one cavalry division and an artillery reserve, numbering 33 700 soldiers (of which 4400 cavalrymen) and 137 cannons, while the other was the siege corps, consisting of 10 400 soldiers and 51 cannons, which besieged the fortress of Pétervárad held by the Hungarians. Jelačić consolidated the Serbian, Croatian and Austrian troops after two months of continuous defeats, and retreats suffered against the Hungarian troops during the Spring Campaign. First he reinforced the Austrian siege corps besieging the fortress of Pétervárad from the South, then he started to plan an attack against the troops of Mór Perczel. The Hungarian commander received an order from the Defence ministry that, according to the new national military plan, he has to send with his 12 000 soldiers to the Upper Danube to help the Hungarian main army under General Artúr Görgei to defeat the Austrian armies led by Field Marshall Julius Jacob von Haynau. Perczel was not agreed with this plan, thinking that instead of decreasing his army, he should be reinforced with more troops. On 22, 24 and 26 May Perczel tried to occupy the trenches of Titel, the last Serbian stronghold on the Northern shore of the Danube, but his troops charges were repelled by the enemy, using the excellent defensive positions behind the swampy area. When on 31 May the troops of Jelačić arrived near Titel, Perczel retreated to Újvidék. On 4 July Perczel tried to break the Austrian blockade on the Southern side of Pétervárad, but the intervention of Jelačić's troops prevented this.

Prelude 
After these smaller victories against Perczel's attacks, Jelačić decided to go on the offensive, so he ordered to his troops to advance from the Titel plateau to Bácska. On 6 July Perczel received the report that Jelačić's troops occupied Káty, Kovilszentiván, Gyurgyevó and Zsablya, and ordered immediately to his troops, stationed at Újvidék, to march there in three columns. The Hungarian troops started their march in the night from 6 to 7 July. The first column, led by Colonel László Gál, marched on the Újvidék-Káty road, the brigade led by Perczel himself went towards the Káty woods, with the cavalry brigade designed to be the reserve, while the brigade led by Major Antal Czintula marched from Csúrog to Zsablya, hoping to attack Jelačić's right wing and rearguard.  The Ban of Croatia placed the Grammont infantry brigade in Káty, and the Ottinger cavalry division in the Káty forest.

In the battle, Perczel could count on 29 1/2 (+ ?) infantry companies, 436 (+ ?) horses, and 24 cannons. This means 5372 (+ ?) soldiers. Did not participate directly 26 infantry companies 456 (+ ?) horses, and 6 cannons. This means 2926 (+ ?) soldiers.

Only about half of Jelačić's army corps was present on the battlefield on 7 June 1849: 26 infantry companies, 12 (+ ?) horses, as well as 12 cannons. This means 3850 soldiers. Did not participate 30 infantry companies, 2 cavalry companies, 359 horses, and 6 cannons. This means 4196 soldiers.

Battle 
The Gál brigade arrived first to the future battlefield, where after a short cannonade, retreated, waiting for Perczel's troops to arrive. Perczel arrived between 4.00 and 5.00 a.m. in front of the Káty forest, and immediately ordered his artillery to deploy and shoot at the Austrian outposts from the wood. At the beginning Lieutenant General Ferenc Ottinger responded only with a cavalry battery, positioning there three cavalry companies to protect the guns, while, behind the forrest, far from Perczel's eyes, he organized the rest of his troops to attack.  During the cannonade Perczel tried a flanking maneuver, ordering to his infantry and cavalry to encircle Ottinger's right wing. Seing this, Ottinger ordered to his cavalry to attack. While Ottinger, leading a cuirassier and a Dragoon regiment tried to distract the Hungarians attention from the front, Major General József Fejérváry attacked Perczel's troops left wing with 4 Cuirassier companies, 2 Lancer companies and a cavalry battery, while Captain Gideon Ritter von Zastavniković directed 5 Cuirassier companies and a half cavalry battery against the right wing. The combined cavalry attack was devastating because it hit the Hungarians from side, right during their flanking march.  First the artillerymen, left without protection, started to rout towards Újvidék, followed by the cavalry, and when Ottinger's went on attack against the infantry, this too started to flee.  Only two companies of the 3. (Ferdinand) Hussar regiment tried to cover the fleeing soldiers, but they had no chance against the four times bigger enemy, even if all the five Hungarian Hussar companies would had fight to their deaths. The Hungarian defeat could had been even greater, if Major General Franz Adam Freiherr Grammont von Linthal would had attacked too. Luckily for the Hungarians the brigade stationed in Káty, failed to participate in the battle, because when Grammont, on march towards the battlefield, when he heard the sound of the cannons, he retreated back to the village, fearing that he will be cut off the rest of the Austrian troops.

Four dragoon and two cuirassier companies led by Colonel Sternberg reached from behind, at the so called Roman trenches, the 8. Hungarian battalion and a battalion of the 62. Hungarian infantry regiment, and crushed them completely. The soldiers of the 8. battalion almost fell prisoners, but they were saved by the Hussars of the Hunyadi Hussar Regiment. In the fight the leader of the battalion, Major Boldizsár Barcza was wounded. The latter even reported to Perczel, in an exaggerating way, that his battalion was completely annihilated. Those who suffered from the Austrian attack the most were the 8. battalion which was crushed, the 41. battalion, half of its soldiers being wounded, and the battalion of the 62. Hungarian infantry regimen, who also suffered serious losses. The exact losses are unknown: Perczel always minimized, while Jellačić overstated them.

Aftermath 
In this battle General Mór Perczel, who demonstrated many times that he did not lack strategic intuition, and he was very courageous too, but he was not very well trained from the tactical point of view. This explains why, Perczel, who won many victories against the Serbian insurgents or inferior Austrian troops, when faced with an uncommon combat task (such as a force of superior quality to his own), tended to rely on his intuition and self-awareness alone to solve it, and subsequently he failed it a several times. That is how he managed to "step into the same river" twice during the War of Independence: after being defeated by Jelačić in the Battle of Mór on 30 December 1848, he was defeated by the same general six months later, in quite a similar way. On both occasions, he was defeated by opposing K.u.k. troops in a way that could have been prevented by more thorough reconnaissance or by ordering the retreat in time, but he was tactically defeated on the battlefield. What makes the story even more interesting is that Lieutenant-General Ferenc Ottinger's cavalry which played a key role in the battle of Mór, was the element that decided also the outcome of the battle of Káty.

After this defeat the Hungarian high commandment from Pest understood that the sending of Hungarian reinforcements from the Southern front to Western Hungary is out of question, because then the Hungarian lines in this region could easily crumble. Perczel, who was asking from long time his dismissal from the commandment of the IV. corps, received the accept for his resignation. So he handed over the command of his troops to Colonel Ágoston Tóth, then he went to the capital. The new commander retreated the weakened Hungarian troops behind the Ferenc Canal (Ferenc csatorna / K.K. Franzens Schiffahrts Canal). However Jelačić did not profited from his victory and the precarious situation of the Hungarian army, but he attacked Újvidék instead, trying to blockade the fortress of Pétervárad from the North, but the town and the Danube bridgehead repelled his attacks. Only after this insuccess he attacked, on 25 July the troops of Colonel Tóth at Óbecse, and forced him to retreat on the Eastern banks of the Tisza. Here again he committed the same mistake like after the Battle of Káty: instead of continuing his attack towards Szeged, he retreated to the Ferenc Canal. This gave the chance to the Hungarians to reorganize their forces, and to put in danger all the successes he achieved.

References

Sources

 

 
 
 

Conflicts in 1849
Hungarian Revolution of 1848
History of Bačka